Corner of a Café-Concert is an 1879 oil on canvas painting by Édouard Manet, now in the National Gallery, London. It is related to his The Waitress.

The two café-concerts 
In August 1874, Manet began work on a large painting of the Brasserie de Reichshoffen Café-concert in the Reichshoffen, where he was fascinated by the skill of the waitresses. While working on the picture, he drastically changed his plans and cut it into two parts which he developed independently, completing each half separately.

This instant view of the cafe is the right side of the larger painting. The model of the beer waitress of the Coin de café-concert is one of the waitresses of the Reichshoffen brewery. According to Duret and Moreau-Nelataon, the waitress agreed to go to Manet's studio, rue d'Amsterdam, to pose.

References

Collections of the National Gallery, London
Paintings by Édouard Manet
1879 paintings
Food and drink paintings
Dance in art